Stephanie Syptak-Ramnath is an American diplomat who is the nominee to be the next US Ambassador to Peru. She currently serves as Deputy Chief of Mission to Mexico.

Early life and education
She is a graduate of Georgetown University's Walsh School of Foreign Service.

Career
Syptak-Ramnath served as Chargé d’Affaires ad interim at the U.S. Embassy Singapore from January 2017 to July 2019, directing 19 U.S. government sections and agencies in the advancement of bilateral security, military, economic, and people-to-people cooperation. During that time, she led Embassy efforts in support of the historic June 2018 Singapore Summit between United States President Donald Trump and North Korean leader Kim Jong-un.

Syptak-Ramnath previously served as Minister Counselor for Public Diplomacy at the U.S. Embassy Mexico City, as Deputy Chief of Mission in Bamako, Mali, and Senior Deputy Director in the Office of Public Diplomacy in the Bureau of European and Eurasian Affairs. Other assignments include Tunis, Tunisia, the U.S. Mission to the United Nations, and Monterrey, Mexico. In November 2015, she was awarded the Department of State’s Edward R. Murrow Award for Excellence in Public Diplomacy.

Prior to joining the Senior Foreign Service, she was an officer in the United States Navy. She was a member of the International Women’s Forum Leadership Foundation 2011-2012 Fellows Class, for which she completed executive programs at Harvard Business School and INSEAD.

Ambassador to Peru
In January 2023, President Joe Biden nominated Syptak-Ramnath as ambassador to Peru. Her nomination is pending before the Senate Foreign Relations Committee.

Personal life
Syptak-Ramnath is married to Gautam Ramnath and has two daughters, one studying at Northwestern University and the other at Pepperdine University. She speaks Spanish and French.

References

Year of birth missing (living people)
Living people
People from Laredo, Texas
Walsh School of Foreign Service alumni
United States Navy officers
United States Department of State officials
American women ambassadors
21st-century American women